Lesja Station is a railway station at Lesja, Norway on the Rauma Line. The station was opened as part of the first stretch of the railway in 1921.

External links
 Jernbaneverket entry 
 NSB entry
 Norsk Jernbaneklub entry

Railway stations in Oppland
Railway stations on the Rauma Line
Railway stations opened in 1921
Lesja